Port of Naval is a seaport located in Naval, Biliran. It is managed by the Philippine Ports Authority.

Location
It is located in Naval, Biliran which is the capital town and trade center for the Biliran province.

Statistics

References

External links

Ports and harbors of the Philippines